Spiloconis is a genus of lacewing.

Species 
 Spiloconis cerata (Hagen, 1858)
 Spiloconis eominuta† Grimaldi & Engel in Grimaldi, Engel, Nascimbene & Singh, 2013
 Spiloconis fijiensis Meinander, 1990
 Spiloconis glaesaria† Meinander, 1998
 Spiloconis maculata (Enderlein, 1906)
 Spiloconis notata (Navás, 1926)
 Spiloconis oediloma† Engel & Grimaldi, 2007
 Spiloconis sexguttata Enderlein, 1907

References 

Coniopterygidae
Neuroptera genera